The 21st Annual Australian Recording Industry Association Music Awards (generally known as ARIA Music Awards or simply The ARIAs) were held on 28 October 2007 at the Acer Arena at the Sydney Olympic Park complex. Rove McManus was the host of the event. The nominees for all categories were announced on 19 September, while the winners of the Artisan Awards were announced on that same day.

Awards and nominations
All nominees are shown in plain, with winners shown in bold.

ARIA Awards
Album of the Year
Silverchair – Young Modern
Gotye – Mixed Blood
The John Butler Trio – Grand National
Powderfinger – Dream Days at the Hotel Existence
Sneaky Sound System – Sneaky Sound System

Single of the Year
Silverchair – "Straight Lines"
Architecture in Helsinki – "Heart It Races"
The John Butler Trio – "Funky Tonight"
Powderfinger – "Lost and Running"
Sneaky Sound System – "UFO"

Best Male Artist
Gotye – Mixed Blood
Dan Kelly – Drowning in the Fountain of Youth
John Butler – Grand National
Josh Pyke – Memories & Dust
Paul Kelly  – Stolen Apples

Best Female Artist
Missy Higgins – On a Clear Night
Kasey Chambers – Carnival
Kate Miller-Heidke – Little Eve
Katie Noonan – "Time to Begin"
Sarah Blasko – What the Sea Wants, the Sea Will Have

Best Group
Silverchair – Young Modern
Eskimo Joe – "Sarah"
Powderfinger – Dream Days at the Hotel Existence
Sneaky Sound System – Sneaky Sound System
Wolfmother – "Joker & the Thief"

Best Adult Contemporary Album
Josh Pyke – Memories & Dust
Art of Fighting – Runaways
Lisa Miller – Morning in the Bowl of Night
New Buffalo – Somewhere, Anywhere
Paul Kelly  – Stolen Apples

Best Blues & Roots Album
The John Butler Trio – Grand National
Ash Grunwald – Give Signs
C. W. Stoneking – King Hokum
Jeff Lang and Chris Whitley – Dislocation Blues
Xavier Rudd – White Moth

Best Children's Album
The Wiggles – Pop Go the Wiggles!
Bindi Irwin – Bindi Kidfitness with Steve Irwin and The Crocmen
Christine Anu – Chrissy's Island Family
Coco's Lunch – Rat Trap Snap
Hi-5 – Wow!
The Fairies – Fairy Beach

Best Comedy Release
Dave Hughes – Live
Lano and Woodley – Goodbye
Rodney Rude – Frog Sack
The Twelfth Man – Boned!
Tripod – Songs from Self Saucing

Best Country Album
Keith Urban – Love, Pain & the whole crazy thing
Gina Jeffreys – Walks of Life
James Blundell – Ring Around the Moon
Lou Bradley – Love Someone
The Greencards – Veridian

Best Dance Release
Sneaky Sound System – Sneaky Sound System
Gotye – Mixed Blood
Hook 'n' Sling and Kid Kenobi – The Bump
poxyMusic – She Bites
TV Rock versus Dukes of Windsor – "The Others"

Best Independent Release
The John Butler Trio – Grand National
Gotye – Mixed Blood
Hilltop Hoods – The Hard Road: Restrung
Sneaky Sound System – Sneaky Sound System
Wolf & Cub – Vessels

Best Music DVD
You Am I – Who Are They, These Rock Stars Live at the Mint
Kisschasy – Kisschasy: The Movie
The Grates – Till Death Do Us Party
The Living End – Live at Festival Hall
Various – The Countdown Spectacular

Best Pop Release
Sarah Blasko – What the Sea Wants, the Sea Will Have
Evermore – "Light Surrounding You"
Kate Miller-Heidke – Little Eve
Missy Higgins – On a Clear Night
Operator Please – "Just a Song About Ping Pong"

Best Rock Album
Silverchair – Young Modern
Airbourne – Runnin' Wild
Grinspoon – Alibis & Other Lies
Jet – Shine On
Powderfinger – Dream Days at the Hotel Existence

Best Urban Release
Hilltop Hoods – The Hard Road: Restrung
Bliss n Eso – Day of the Dog: Phazed Out
Foreign Heights – Get Yours Remix
Jackson Jackson – The Fire Is on the Bird
Justice & Kaos – Turn It On

Breakthrough Artist – Album
Sneaky Sound System – Sneaky Sound System
Airbourne – Runnin' Wild
Expatriate – In the Midst of This
Josh Pyke – Memories & Dust
Kate Miller-Heidke – Little Eve

Breakthrough Artist – Single
Operator Please – "Just a Song About Ping Pong"
Damien Leith – "Night of My Life"
Kate Miller-Heidke – "Words"
Small Mercies – "Innocent"
Something With Numbers – "Apple of the Eye (Lay Me Down)"

Highest Selling Album
Damien Leith – The Winner's Journey
Missy Higgins – On a Clear Night
Human Nature – Dancing in the Street: the Songs of Motown II
Silverchair – Young Modern
The Twelfth Man – Boned!

Highest Selling Single
Silverchair – "Straight Lines"
Natalie Bassingthwaighte and Shannon Noll – "Don't Give Up"
Missy Higgins – "Steer"
Damien Leith – "Night of My Life"
Wolfmother – "Joker & the Thief"

Fine Arts Awards
Best Classical Album
Richard Tognetti, Australian Chamber Orchestra – Bach Violin Concertos
Accademia Arcadia – Trio Sonatas
Adelaide Symphony Orchestra, Arvo Volmer – Sculthorpe Requiem and Orchestral Works
Michael Keiran Harvey – Carl Vine Piano Music 1990-2006
Slava Grigoryan, Leonard Grigoryan – Impressions

Best Jazz Album
Mike Nock and Dave Liebman – Duologue
Alister Spence Trio – Mercury
Andrea Keller Quartet – Little Claps
Joe Chindamo and Graeme Lyall – Smokingun
Mark Isaacs – Resurgence

Best Original Soundtrack / Cast / Show Album
Choir of Hard Knocks – Choir of Hard Knocks
David Bridie – Gone
Monsieur Camembert – Famous Blue Cheese
David Bridie – The Circuit
Various – The Countdown Spectacular Live

Best World Album
Zulya and The Children of The Underground – 3 Nights
Coco's Lunch – Blueprint
Coda – Calling Mission Mu
Joseph Tawadros – Epiphany
Not Drowning, Waving – Maps for Sonic Adventures

Artisan Awards
The Artisan Award winners were announced on 19 September. The winners are shown in bold, other nominees are in plain.

Producer of the Year
Wayne Connolly, Josh Pyke – Josh Pyke – Memories & Dust
Nash Chambers – Kasey Chambers – Carnival
Magoo – Kate Miller-Heidke – Little Eve
Angus McDonald, Peter Dolso – Sneaky Sound System – Sneaky Sound System
Phillip McKellar – Something With Numbers – Perfect Distraction

Engineer of the Year
Wayne Connolly – Josh Pyke – Memories & Dust
Doug Brady – David Campbell – The Swing Sessions
Magoo – Operator Please – "Just a Song About Ping Pong"
Paul McKercher – Sarah Blasko – What the Sea Wants, the Sea Will Have
Peter Dolso – Sneaky Sound System – Sneaky Sound System

Best Cover Art
Aaron Hayward, Dave Homer (Debaser) – Powderfinger – Dream Days at the Hotel Existence
Wally De Backer – Gotye – Mixed Blood
John Engelhardt – Hilltop Hoods – The Hard Road: Restrung
Sharon Chai, Sarah Blasko – Sarah Blasko – What the Sea Wants, the Sea Will Have
Hackett Films – Silverchair – Young Modern

Best Video
Paul Goldman, Alice Bell – Silverchair – "Straight Lines"
Ben Saunders, Germain McMicking – Augie March – "The Cold Acre"
Brendan Cook – Gotye – "Heart's a Mess"
Damon Escott, Stephan Lance (Head Pictures) – Powderfinger – "Lost and Running"
Angus McDonald, Daimon Downey – Sneaky Sound System – "Pictures"

ARIA Hall of Fame Inductees
The following were inducted into the 2007 ARIA Hall of Fame on 18 July:
 Frank Ifield
 Hoodoo Gurus
 Marcia Hines
 Jo Jo Zep & The Falcons
 Brian Cadd
 Radio Birdman

Added to these inductees on 28 October, was:
Nick Cave

Instead of a traditional acceptance speech, Cave noted that he didn't understand why he was inducted and the Bad Seeds weren't. Due to the membership of Tomas Wylder (Switzerland), Jim Sclavunos (United States), and James Johnston (UK), the band does not qualify as Australian. In rebellion against this ruling, Cave unofficially inducted Mick Harvey, Warren Ellis, Conway Savage and Martyn P. Casey of the Bad Seeds; as well as Rowland S. Howard and Tracy Pew of the Birthday Party; "by the power vested in [him] by this award". Cave did not name Hugo Race of the Bad Seeds nor Phill Calvert of The Birthday Party, who are Australian, in his unofficial induction. He did, however, close by thanking his mother, wife and sons.

Channel V Oz Artist of the Year award

Evermore
Silverchair
The Veronicas
Kisschasy

Performers
It was announced that the following artists were the special performers of the event:

Main Show
Powderfinger
Silverchair
The John Butler Trio with Keith Urban
Missy Higgins
Sneaky Sound System
Gotye
Operator Please
Kate Miller-Heidke

Red-Carpet
Ricki-Lee Coulter
The Veronicas

Controversy
The broadcast of the 2007 awards was controversial; it was revealed by Australian Broadcasting Corporation (ABC)'s Media Watch that Channel 10 had used subliminal advertising—which is illegal under Australian Media and Broadcasting rules—TEN disputed the finding, however their defence was also criticised by Media Watch, as demonstrating ignorance of these rules.

Notes

References

External links
ARIA Awards official website
List of 2007 winners

ARIA Music Awards
2007 in Australian music
2007 music awards